A strategy is a long term plan of action designed to achieve a particular goal.

Strategy may also refer to:

Game theory
 Strategy (game theory), a complete plan of action in a game or a business situation
 Mixed strategy, a game theory strategy which chooses randomly between possible moves
 Evolutionarily stable strategy, a term from evolutionary game theory

Business
 Corporate strategy, a series of top-level management decisions which help navigate the direction of the corporation in terms of products, markets, promotion and price levels
 Business strategy, the art and science of enabling an organization to achieve its objective
 Marketing strategy, a process that allows an organization to increase sales and achieve a competitive advantage
 Technology strategy, a document that explains how information technology should be used as part of a business strategy
 Trading strategy, a predefined set of rules to apply in finance
 Strategy&, formerly Booz & Company, an American consulting firm
Strategy (magazine), a Canadian business magazine

Gaming
 American football strategy
 Chess strategy, the evaluation of positions and setting up goals and tactics in chess
 Poker strategy
 Strategy game, a game in which the players' decision-making skills determine the outcome, rather than chance
 Strategy video game, a video game in which the players' long-term planning skills determine the outcome, rather than reflexes

Geopolitics and military planning
Geostrategy, a foreign policy guided principally by geographical factors pertaining to political and military planning
Grand strategy, military strategy at the level of an entire nation state or empire's resources
Military strategy, planning the conduct of warfare
Naval strategy
Nuclear strategy
Strategy, a classic text on military strategy by B. H. Liddell Hart
Fabian strategy

Other uses
Strategy (album) by the band Level 42
Strategy pattern, a computer science design pattern
Strategy (TV series), a 1969 Canadian television game show
Coping strategies in psychology, to solve problems and minimize or tolerate stress or conflict